Karen Borca (born September 5, 1948 in Green Bay, Wisconsin) is an American avant-garde jazz and free jazz bassoonist.

Early life and education 
Borca studied music at the University of Wisconsin with John Barrows and Arthur Weisberg, graduating in 1971. 

While at the University of Wisconsin, she met Cecil Taylor, who taught at the university during the 1970/1971 academic year. Borca studied with Taylor, played in his big bands, ensembles, and the Cecil Taylor Unit, and was his assistant while he worked in the Black Music Program at Antioch College in Yellow Springs, Ohio.

She was an assistant to Taylor's longtime collaborator, saxophonist Jimmy Lyons, while he was artist-in-residence at Bennington College in Bennington, Vermont in 1974. Borca and Lyons got married, and she played in his ensemble until he died in 1986.

Career 
In 1976, Borca performed in a production of Adrienne Kennedy's A Rat's Mass directed by Cecil Taylor at La MaMa Experimental Theatre Club in the East Village of Manhattan. Musicians Rashid Bakr, Andy Bey, David S. Ware, Raphe Malik, and Lyons also performed in the production. Taylor's production combined the original script with a chorus of orchestrated voices used as instruments.

Borca has performed with her own ensembles at the Newport Jazz Festival New York City Salute to Women in Jazz in 1978 and 1979, Soundscape, Vision Festival, and Jazz Fest Berlin, among many other festivals and concerts. She has performed in the United States and internationally, with musicians such as William Parker, Bill Dixon, Butch Morris, Marco Eneidi, Joel Futterman, Sonny Simmons, Alan Silva, and Jackson Krall.

Discography 
With Jimmy Lyons
 1978: Push Pull (Hathut Records)
 1980: Riffs (Hathut Records)
 1985: Give It Up (Black Saint Records)
 1983: Wee Sneezawee (Black Saint Records)
 1972–1985: The Box Set (Ayler)

With Alan Silva
 1999: Alan Silva & the Sound Visions Orchestra (Eremite Records)
 2003: H.Con.Res.57/Treasure Box (Eremite Records)

With others
 1982: Red Snapper: Paul Murphy at CBS (Paul Murphy, Cadence Jazz Records)
 1983: Cloudburst (Paul Murphy, Murphy Records)
 1983: Moments (Joel Futterman, Ear Rational)
 1984: Passage (Joel Futterman, Ear Rational)
 1986: Winged Serpent (Sliding Quadrants) (Cecil Taylor, Soul Note Records)
 1994: Final Disconnect Notice (Marco Eneidi, Botticelli)
 1999: Many Rings (Joe Morris, Knitting Factory)
 2001: Waking the Living, Earth People (Undivided Vision)
 2001: The Cosmosamatics (Sonny Simmons, Boxholder)
 2008: 17 Musicians in Search of a Sound: Darfur (Bill Dixon, AUM Fidelity)

References

External links 

[ Karen Borca] at AllMusic
Borca's page on La MaMa Archives Digital Collections

American jazz bassoonists
Living people
1948 births
Musicians from Green Bay, Wisconsin
University of Wisconsin–Madison alumni